André Heyboer (born in 1971 in Brive-la-Gaillarde) is a French contemporary baritone.

In 2005, he began a career as a baritone. Today, he performs in works from the 19th century French and Italian repertoire (Verdi, Puccini, Bizet, Massenet) without neglecting contemporary creation (La Métamorphose by Michaël Levinas).

Biography 

Heyboer began his musical apprenticeship at the age of eleven when he began practicing singing in the choirs of Terrasson-Lavilledieu and the Camerata Vocal of Brive. 
He studied classical guitar for eight years.
 
He moved from choral singing to the roles of soloist, and developed his technique through private teaching. He met artists such as José van Dam. He followed the master classes of the "Master of Music" and took part in several concerts alongside him. At the Capitole de Toulouse he was a soloist in Charpentier's Louise (direction by Nicolas Joel, conductor Michel Plasson).

He played Pristav in Boris Godunov, Noah in Britten's Noye's Fludde and a Flemish Member of Parliament in Don Carlos.

From 2006 to 2010, he sang with some noted interpreters interpreters (Neil Schicoff, Roberto Scianduzzi, Violeta Urmana, Dennis O Neill, Annick Massis, Natalie Dessay, Sophie Koch, Ludovic Tezier). At the Capitole de Toulouse he sang Wagner in Faust, Jahel in Le roi d'Ys and Roucher in Giordano's Andrea Chenier.

At the Paris Opera he sang Rugierro in Fromental Halévy's La Juive (2007) and De Bretigny in Manon (2012).

In 2009 he sang on the land of his Dutch ancestors at the Amsterdam Opera House, performing La Juive. He sang Melot in Tristan und Isolde at the same time as he took on the role of Kurwenal at the Forum de Montpellier.

In Dijon, he played Macbeth (2008), Enrico in Lucia di Lammermoor (2009), Valentin in Gounod's Faust (2007).

He took part in the premiere of Michaël Levinas's  La Métamorphose at the Opéra de Lille, a production which won the "Grand Prix of the Academie Charles Cros" in 2012 and the "Prix de l'Académie lyrique du disque". 
 
In 2012 he played Zurga  at the Opéra comique in Bizet's Les Pêcheurs de Perles with Sonya Yoncheva and Dmitri Korshak and Nicolas Testé. At the end of that same year, he took part in the recording CD of Catel's Les bayadères, and (Olkar) in Sofia at the Centre de musique romantique française.

In 2013, he was Padre Camoine in Mascagni's Amica at the Opéra de Monte-Carlo. In April of the same year, he sang, accompanied by Éloïse Urbain, an opera recital as part of the "Great Performers" season of the Sinfonia festival in Périgord.

At the Paris Opéra, Sonora in La fanciulla del West at Bastille, and finally Alfio at the Capitole de Toulouse in Cavalleria Rusticana. He took part in Tosca in the Dutch National Opera.

In the 2017–2018 season, he sang the cycle of the Winterreise accompanied by Éloïse Urbain in the season of the great interpreters of Sinfonia in Périgueux.

Roles

2021
Edison: Philippe Hersant's Les Éclairs, Opéra-Comique, Paris.

2018 
Paolo Albiani: Gounod's La Nonne sanglante, Opéra Comique, conductor: Laurence Equilbey

Sharpless: Puccini's Madame Butterfly, Opéra de Limoges, conductor: Robert Tuohy

2017 
Paolo Albiani: Verdi's Simon Boccanegra, Opéra de Monte-Carlo, conductor: Pinchas Steinberg

Paolo Albiani: Verdi's Simon Boccanegra Théâtre des Champs-Élysées, conductor: Pinchas Steinberg

Trivia: Viva Verdi, Théâtre des Champs-Élysées, conductor: Giampaolo Bisanti

2016 
Great priest of Dagon: Camille Saint-Saëns's Samson et Dalila, Palau de les Arts Reina Sofia, conductor: Roberto Abbado
Nabucco: Verdi's Nabucco, Opéra-théâtre de Saint-Étienne, conductor: David Reiland.
Sciarrone: Puccini's La Tosca, Opéra Bastille, conductor: Dan Ettinger

2015 
Baritone: Chausson's Poème de l'amour et de la mer, Rouen Opera House, conductor: Leo Hussain
Baritone: Berlioz's Lélio, Palau de les Arts Reina Sofia with Mario Zeffiri, Nacho Fresneda, conductor: Roberto Abbado
Athanaël: Massenet's Thaïs, Theatro Municipal (São Paulo) with Ermonela Jaho, Sara Rossi Daldoss, Lado Ataneli, conductor: Alain Guingal
Paolo Albiani: Verdi's Simon Boccanegra with Dario Solari, Celia Costea, and Hector Sandoval, Opéra de Toulon, conductor: Giuliano Carella
Le Viconte de Fontrailles: Gounod's Cinq Mars with Charles Castronovo, Véronique Gens and Melody Louledjian, Royal Opera of Versailles, conductor: Ulf Schirmer

2014 
Sciarrone: Puccini's La Tosca with Martina Serafin, Béatrice Uria-Monzon, Ludovic Tézier, Marco Berti, Opéra Bastille, conductor: Daniel Oren, Evelino Pidò
Alfio:  Mascagni's Cavalleria rusticana with Elena Bocherova, Nicolaï Schukoff, Sarah Jouffroy, Elena Zilio, Théâtre du Capitole de Toulouse, conductor: Tugan Sokhiev
Sonora: Puccini's La fanciulla del West with Nina Stemme, Marco Berti and Claudio Sgura, Opéra de Paris, conductor Carlo Rizzi

2013 
Camoine: Amica by Pietro Mascagni with Amarilli Nizza, Enrique Ferrer, and Lucio Gallo, Opéra de Monte-Carlo, conductor Gianluigi Gelmetti
Nilakantha: Delibes's Lakmé with Marie-Eve Munger, Cyrille Dubois, Opéra-théâtre de Saint-Étienne, conductor Laurent Campellone

2012 
The father: Michaël Levinas's La Métamorphose, with Magalie Leger, Simon Bailey, Opéra de Lille, conductor Georges-Elie Octors
Zurga: Bizets Les Pêcheurs de Perles with Sonya Yoncheva, Dmitry Korchak and Nicolas Testé, Théâtre national de l'Opéra-Comique, conductor Léo Hussain
De Brétigny: Jules Massenet's Manon, with Natalie Dessay, Giuseppe Filianoti, Jean François Borras, Marianne Fiset, Franck Ferrari, Paul Gay and Luca Lombardo, Opéra Bastille, conductor Evelino Pido
Valentin: Gounod's Faust, Festival d'Avignon with Nathalie Manfrino, Florian Laconi and Nicolas Cavallier, conductor Dominique Trottein, and Opéra de Reims with Guylaine Girard, Sébastien Guèze and Nicolas Cavallier
Olkar: Charles-Simon Catel's Les bayadères, (in concert in Sofia, Bulgaria) with Chantal Santon, Philippe Do, Mathias Vidal, Katia Velletaz, Kareen Durand, Elodie Méchain, Eric Martin-Bonnet, Frédéric Caton, conductor: Didier Talpain

2011 
Cristiano: Verdi's Un Ballo in Maschera with Violeta Urmana, Ludovic Tézier, Elisabetta Fiorillo, Opéra de Monte-Carlo, conductor Daniele Callegari
Garrido: Massenet's La Navarraise with Marie Kalinine, Opéra-théâtre de Saint-Étienne, conductor Laurent Campellone
Alfio : Mascagni's Cavalleria Rusticana with Marie Kalinine, Opéra-théâtre de Saint-Étienne, conductor Laurent Campellone

2010 
Roucher: Giordano's Andrea Chénier with Irène Cerboncini, Zoran Todorovich, Marco Di Felice, Opéra de Marseille, conductor Fabrizio Maria Carminati
Lescaut: Massenet's Manon with Nathalie Manfrino and Florian Laconi, Marcel Vanaud, Opéra de Hong Kong, conductor Nicola Colabianchi

2009 
Roucher: Giordano's Andrea Chénier with Marcello Alvarez, Micaela Carosi and Sergei Murzaev, Opéra Bastille, conductor Daniel Oren
Ruggiero: Halévy's La Juive with Dennis O'Neil, Annick Massis, Angeles Blancas Gulin, John Osborn and Alistair Miles, Opéra d'Amsterdam, conductor Pierre Audi
Wagner: Gounod's Faust with Inva Mula, Giuseppe Filianoti and Orlin Anastasov, Théâtre du Capitole de Toulouse, conductor Emmanuel Plasson
Enrico: Donizetti's Lucia di Lammermoor with Burcu Uyar, Andrea Giovannini and Jean Teitgen, Auditorium de Dijon, conductor Claude Schnitzler

2008 
Macbeth: Verdi's Macbeth, with Cécile Perrin and Jérôme Varnier (Auditorium de Dijon), conductor: Dominique Trottein
Spendius: Ernest Reyer's Salammbô with Kate Aldrich, Gilles Ragon, Wojtek Smilek, Sebastien Guèze and Jean-Philippe Lafont, Opéra de Marseille, conductor Lawrence Foster

2007 
Rigoletto: Verdi's Rigoletto (with Philippe Do, Liliana Faraon, Sédières, conductor Jérôme Devaud
Valentin: Gounod's Faust with Fiorella Buratto, Nicolas Cavallier, Jean Pierre Furlan, Auditorium de Dijon, conductor Claude Schnitzler
Jahel: Édouard Lalo's Le Roi d’Ys with Paul Gay, Sophie Koch and Inva Mula, Franck Ferrari, Capitole de Toulouse, conductor Yves Abel

2006 
The jailer, the 2nd commissioner: Poulenc's Le Dialogue des carmélites with Barbara Ducret, Manon Feubel, Marie-Ange Todorovitch, Gilles Ragon, Opéra de Marseille, conductor Patrick Davin
Marullo: Verdi's Rigoletto with Giuseppe Gipali and Carlos Almaguer, Opéra de Marseille, conductor Paolo Arrivabeni
Marco: Puccini's Gianni Schicchi with Juan Pons, Anne-Catherine Gillet and Ismaël Jordi, Capitole de Toulouse, conductor Marco Armiliato
Le Mandarin: Puccini's Turandot with Cynthia Makris and Jean-François Borras, Opéra de Marseille, conductor Daniel Klajner

2005 
Noé: Benjamin Britten's Arche de Noé, Opéra de Marseille, conductor Christophe Larrieu
Pristav: Modeste Mussorgski's Boris Godunov with Anatoli Kotcherga and Alexander Anisimov, Philip Langridge, Capitole de Toulouse, conductor Bernhard Kontarsky
Un député flamand: Verdi's Don Carlos, with Ludovic Tézier, Fabio Armiliato, Daniela Dessì and Roberto Scandiuzzi, Capitole de Toulouse, conductor Maurizio Benini
Melot: Wagner's Tristan und Isolde, Hedwig Fassbender and Corum (Montpellier), conductor Friedemann Layer
Giorgio Germont: Verdi's La Traviata, with Svetlana Doneva, Marc Laho and Sebastien Guèze, Opéra de Marseille

Discography 
 Catel's Les bayadères, Ensemble Solamentene Naturali, direction Didier Talpain, éditions Singulares
 Michaël Levinas's La Métamorphose, Ensemble Ictus, direction Georges-Elie Octors, éditions Aeon

References

External links 
 Official website
 André Heyboer - Les pêcheurs de Perles - Duo Leila Zurga on YouTube

French operatic baritones
21st-century French singers
1971 births
Living people
People from Brive-la-Gaillarde
21st-century French male singers